Redneck Zombies is a 1987 American horror comedy trash film directed by Pericles Lewnes and released by Troma Entertainment.

Production
Redneck Zombies was one of the first films shot entirely on videotape and then released to the home-video market (making it a straight-to-video film). The film was once used as an answer in a 1980s edition of Trivial Pursuit, the question being "What film has the tagline 'They're Tobacco Chewin', Gut Chompin', Cannibal Kinfolk from Hell!'". Director Pericles Lewnes went on to work as a special effects supervisor on several other Troma productions. William Benson (Pa) went on to become an Emmy-award winning director for NASA.

Cast
 Lisa M. DeHaven as Lisa Dubois
 James H. Housely as Wilbur
 Martin J. Wolfman as Andy
 Anthony Burlington-Smith as Bob 
 Tyrone Taylor as Sgt. Tyrone Robinson
 Bucky Santini	as Ferd Mertz
 Boo Teasedale as Sally
 Darla Deans as Theresa
 Joe Benson as Hoss
 William Decker as Jethro Clemson
 P. Floyd Piranha as Junior Clemson
 Pericles Lewnes as Billy Bob Clemson
 William E. Benson as Jed Clemson
 Alice Fay Stanley as Imelda Clemson
 Stan Morrow as Dr. Kildare
 Brent Thurston-Rogers as Dr. Casey 
 Allan Hogg as Colonel Sir
 Frank Lantz as Crazy Hitchhiker
 Joan Murphy as Knockers
 Sandy Bishop as Miz Ashley
 Alex Lewnes as Fester Ashley
 Matthew A. Goldberg as Matt
 Benjamin K. Goldberg as Ben
 J. Nick Alberto as Jake The Butcher 
 Michael Poole as Butcher's Customer
 Jan Luffman as Butcher's Victim
 Jim Bellistri as Private Loren
 Peter Kief as Private Sherman
 E.W. Nesneb as Tobacco Man
 Steve Sooy as Mental Patient One
 Anthony M. Carr as Attendant One
 Ken Davis as Mental Patient Two
 William Craft as Victim

Release
The film was released on VHS and DVD by Troma Entertainment.  A new 20th anniversary edition of the film was released on DVD January 27, 2009. It includes the never before released soundtrack on CD. In 2022 the film was re-released by VHS Haven on a limited edition VHS.

References

External links 
 
 
 Troma Studios Website
 BadMovies.org Review

1987 films
1987 horror films
1980s comedy horror films
Camcorder films
American comedy horror films
American zombie comedy films
Troma Entertainment films
Parodies of horror
1987 comedy films
1980s English-language films
1980s American films